Tehranjavan F.C. was an Iranian football club established in 1944 by Hossein Fekri. He is one of Persepolis F.C. former managers.

Football clubs in Iran
Association football clubs established in 1944
1944 establishments in Iran